Anders Lysne (born 21 May 1926 – 29 May 2015) was a Norwegian educator.

He was born in Lærdal. After teachers' college and a tenure as a teacher, he took the mag.art. degree in pedagogy at the University of Oslo in 1961. He followed with the dr.philos. degree in 1970, was a docent from the same year and professor from 1972 to 1996. He also headed the International Summer School at the University of Oslo from 1986 to 1992. Lysne was a member of the university's board ("academic college") and of NAVF.

He resided at Haslum. He died at age 89.

References

1926 births
2015 deaths
People from Lærdal
Norwegian schoolteachers
Norwegian educationalists
University of Oslo alumni
Academic staff of the University of Oslo